Appalachian Airlines was a US commuter airline that operated out of northeast Tennessee.
It was founded in 1977 as Appalachian Flying Service, and ceased its operations in 1980.  At one time, the airline operated a fleet of seven Piper Navajo aircraft on its routes and also offered same-day parcel delivery service.

Destinations
Appalachian Airlines offered scheduled flights to the following destinations:
Beckley, West Virginia - Beckley Raleigh County Memorial Airport
Bluefield, West Virginia - Mercer County Airport (West Virginia)
Charleston, West Virginia - Yeager Airport
Elkins, West Virginia - Elkins-Randolph County Airport
Tri-Cities, Tennessee -  Tri-Cities Regional Airport
Roanoke, Virginia - Roanoke Regional Airport
Wise County, Virginia - Lonesome Pine Airport

See also 
 List of defunct airlines of the United States

References

Defunct airlines of the United States
Airlines established in 1977
Airlines disestablished in 1980
Airlines based in Tennessee